Shaun Simpson (born July 22, 1966) is a retired professional wrestler from South Africa.

Career
Shaun Simpson is the son of professional wrestler Alec Simpson, who wrestled as Sammy Cohen. Shaun made his debut in 1987 for World Class Championship Wrestling. He formed a tag team with his brother, Steve Simpson, subsequently winning the WCWA World Tag Team titles. Their biggest feud was against John Tatum and Jack Victory.

In World Class, the Simpsons were allied (in storylines) with the Von Erich family, and were fan favorites in the territory.

He left WCCW with his brother in late 1989 to wrestle in South Africa but Steve Simpson returned in 1991 to wrestle in Global Wrestling Federation in Texas.

Championships and accomplishments
Pro Wrestling Illustrated
PWI ranked him #376 of the top 500 singles wrestlers in the PWI 500 in 1992
PWI ranked him #341 of the top 500 singles wrestlers in the PWI 500 in 1991
Texas Wrestling Federation
TWF Light-Heavyweight Championship (1 time)
Wild West Wrestling
Wild West Tag Team Championship (2 times) - with Steve Simpson
World Class Championship Wrestling / World Class Wrestling Association
WCWA Texas Tag Team Championship (3 times) - with Steve Simpson
WCWA World Light Heavyweight Championship (1 time)
WCWA World Tag Team Championship (1 time) - with Steve Simpson

References

1966 births
20th-century professional wrestlers
Living people
South African male professional wrestlers